Sammy Tindol Rachels III (born September 23, 1950) is an American professional golfer who has played on the PGA Tour and the Nationwide Tour, but found his greatest level of success on the Champions Tour.

Rachels was born, raised and lived his entire life in DeFuniak Springs, Florida. He attended Columbus College and won the 1971 NAIA Championship. He turned professional in 1972.

Rachels played on the PGA Tour from 1975–1985, and had 11 top-10 finishes in 123 career events. Although he never won, his career year was 1983 when he finished T-2 in the Danny Thomas Memphis Classic and the Bank of Boston Classic. He also had a runner-up finish in the unofficial Magnolia State Classic that year. His best finish in a major championship was T6 at the 1981 U.S. Open. Four back operations forced him to leave the Tour and take a club pro job near his home in the Florida Panhandle.

Rachels joined the Nationwide Tour in his forties to prepare for the Champions Tour, which he joined after reaching the age of 50 in September 2000. He won three events in his first two years on the Champions Tour.

Professional wins (4)

Other wins (1)
1994 PGA Club Professional Championship

Senior PGA Tour wins (3)

Senior PGA Tour playoff record (1–0)

Results in major championships

Note: Rachels never played in the Masters Tournament or The Open Championship.

CUT = missed the half-way cut
"T" indicates a tie for a place

U.S. national team appearances
PGA Cup: 1990 (winners), 1996 (tie)

See also
Spring 1975 PGA Tour Qualifying School graduates
1982 PGA Tour Qualifying School graduates

References

External links

American male golfers
PGA Tour golfers
PGA Tour Champions golfers
Golfers from Florida
People from DeFuniak Springs, Florida
1950 births
Living people